Cynthia Stevenson (born August 2, 1962) is an American actress. She first played a leading role in the syndicated parody comedy series My Talk Show (1990–91), before starring in a number of sitcoms, including Bob (CBS, 1992–93), Hope & Gloria (NBC, 1995–96), and Oh Baby (Lifetime, 1998-2000).

Stevenson made her big screen debut in Robert Altman's 1992 satirical film The Player. She later has appeared in a number of films including Forget Paris (1995), Home for the Holidays (1995), Happiness (1998), Air Bud: Golden Receiver (1998) and its sequels, and Agent Cody Banks (2003) and its sequel. Stevenson also starred in the Showtime comedy-drama Dead Like Me (2003–04) and the ABC comedy-drama Men in Trees (2006–08).

Life and career
Stevenson was born in Oakland, California, the daughter of Gayle, an editor, and Al Stevenson, an upholstery warehouse owner. She grew up in Vancouver, British Columbia. She lived from age 10–20 in Vancouver, and moved back when worked there from 2001 to 2008. She attended University of Victoria in Victoria, BC.

In 1987, Stevenson made her television debut appearing in an episode of Max Headroom. She later starred in the made-for-television movies A Father's Homecoming and Double Your Pleasure, and played a leading role alongside Suzie Plakson in the 1989 pilot for Married to the Mob. Also in 1989, she appeared as Norm Peterson's high-strung secretary Doris in two episodes of Cheers.

1990s
Stevenson played a leading role in the short-lived syndicated comedy series My Talk Show from 1990 to 1991. The following year, she was cast alongside Bob Newhart and Carlene Watkins in the CBS sitcom Bob). The series was canceled after two seasons. Also in 1992, she made her big screen debut in the comedy film The Player directed by Robert Altman. She later had roles in a number of comedy films, including Watch It (1993), Forget Paris (1995), Home for the Holidays (1995), Live Nude Girls (1995), Happiness (1998), Air Bud: Golden Receiver (1998) and its sequels. From 1995 to 1996, she starred as Hope, a high-strung television producer, in the NBC sitcom Hope and Gloria, which ran for two seasons and 35 episodes. In 1998, she played Jane Conrad, former wife of astronaut Pete Conrad in the HBO miniseries From the Earth to the Moon. Later that year, Stevenson began starring as a single working woman who decides to have a child through artificial insemination in the Lifetime comedy series, Oh Baby. The series ended in 2000.

2000s–present
Stevenson played mother of Frankie Muniz's character in the 2003 spy comedy film Agent Cody Banks and in its sequel Agent Cody Banks 2 the following year. From 2003 to 2004, she was a regular cast member in the Showtime dark comedy-drama series Dead Like Me, playing lead character George (Ellen Muth)'s mother. In 2009, she starred in its sequel film, Dead like Me: Life After Death. In April 2006, she completed filming a sitcom pilot for CBS called You've Reached the Elliotts, starring opposite Chris Elliott as his wife, which was not picked up by the network. She had a recurring role on the Showtime drama series The L Word, and co-starred with Judy Davis in the 2006 comedy-drama film A Little Thing Called Murder. She also appeared in Six Feet Under, Monk and in multiple episodes of According to Jim. She also appeared in films Neverwas (2005), Full of It (2007), Will You Marry Me? (2008), I Love You, Beth Cooper (2009) and Case 39 (2009).

From 2006 to 2008, Stevenson starred in the ABC comedy-drama series, Men in Trees, which was taped in Vancouver. In April 2009, she co-starred opposite Bob Saget on the short-lived ABC sitcom Surviving Suburbia. In 2010, she had a recurring role as Shiri Appleby's character's mother on The CW drama series Life Unexpected. In 2010, she also appeared in the music video for the song "Fuckin' Perfect" by Pink.

Stevenson appeared in Shonda Rhimes dramas Grey's Anatomy in 2010, Off the Map and Private Practice in 2011, Scandal in 2013, and from 2018 to 2020 played Pam Walsh, Connor's mother on How to Get Away with Murder. In 2014, she played villainous housekeeper in the Lifetime television film Killing Daddy and in 2015, starred alongside Ed Begley Jr. in the TBS comedy series Your Family or Mine.

Filmography

Film

Television

References

External links

American film actresses
American television actresses
Canadian people of American descent
Canadian film actresses
Canadian television actresses
People from Oakland, California
1962 births
Living people
Alumni of the Drama Studio London
Actresses from Vancouver
20th-century American actresses
21st-century American actresses
University of Victoria alumni